Perica "Peri" Marošević (born May 5, 1989) is an American former soccer player.

Early life
Marošević was born to a Croat father and a Serb mother in Bosnia in Yugoslavia prior to the Bosnian War, and initially moved to Frankfurt, Germany with his parents as a young child to escape the conflict, before eventually settling in Rockford, Illinois.

Career

Youth and college
Marošević attended Guilford High School in Rockford, IL and Edison High School in Bradenton, FL, played club soccer with the Rockford Raptors and Chicago Sockers, and played college soccer at the University of Michigan, where he was named to the CoSida Academic All-District First Team in 2007, was a two-time All-Big Ten Second Team nominee and a one-time All-Big Ten First Team nominee, scoring 24 goals and registering seven assists becoming the team's leading scorer 2 out of his 3 seasons. During his college years he also played with Chicago Fire Premier in the USL Premier Development League.

Professional
Marošević was drafted in the first round (fifth overall) by FC Dallas in the 2009 MLS SuperDraft, and signed to a Generation Adidas contract. He made his professional debut on March 29, 2009 in a Dallas's game against Chivas USA.  In April 2009, Peri appeared alongside 14 other Major League Soccer Players on Cosmogirl.com's "Hottest Soccer Guys".

In June 2010, having found it increasingly difficult to break into the FC Dallas first team, Marošević was loaned to USSF-D2 side Austin Aztex. He made his debut for the Aztex on June 19, coming on as a substitute against Miami FC. Marošević scored a hat-trick for the Aztex in a second round Lamar Hunt U.S. Open Cup game against Arizona Sahuaros on June 22, 2010. The young striker ended his month-long loan deal tallying four goals in four games.

Marošević was signed by Toronto FC on July 28, 2011, after asking to be released from FC Dallas. Two days later Marošević made his debut for Toronto as a second half sub for Nick Soolsma against Portland Timbers, with Toronto down 2–0. Marosevic ignited a comeback by scoring on his debut in the 63rd minute followed by a Danny Koevermans strike, earning a well-fought 2–2 away draw for Toronto FC. In Toronto's next league match against DC United, Peri again came in the game as a second-half substitute earning his second league goal in only two league appearances for Toronto FC. The game ended in a 3–3 draw. Marošević made his mark on the Reds season once again scoring against UNAM Pumas in the CONCACAF Champions League group stage, the game ended in a 1–1 home draw to the Mexican side.

Marošević declined a contract offer by Toronto FC in January 2012.  In October 2012, he signed with NK Junak Sinj of the Croatian second division.

On February 21, 2013, Marošević signed on to play for New York Cosmos in the team's inaugural year in the NASL.

In July, 2014, the New York Cosmos cut ties with  Marošević.

International
Marošević has been a member of the U.S. U-17, U-18, and U-20 national teams. He was a member of the squad for the United States in the 2009 U-20 FIFA World Cup, coming on as a substitute at halftime in a 3–0 loss to Korea.

References

External links
 

1989 births
Living people
People from Brčko District
Bosnia and Herzegovina emigrants to the United States
Soccer players from Illinois
Sportspeople from Rockford, Illinois
American people of Croatian descent
American people of Serbian descent
Association football forwards
Bosnia and Herzegovina footballers
American soccer players
United States men's under-20 international soccer players
United States men's youth international soccer players
Footballers at the 2007 Pan American Games
Pan American Games competitors for the United States
Michigan Wolverines men's soccer players
Chicago Fire U-23 players
Chicago Sockers players
FC Dallas draft picks
FC Dallas players
Austin Aztex FC players
Toronto FC players
NK Junak Sinj players
New York Cosmos (2010) players
Flint City Bucks players
Major League Soccer players
First Football League (Croatia) players
North American Soccer League players
USL League Two players
USSF Division 2 Professional League players
American expatriate soccer players
Expatriate footballers in Croatia
American expatriate sportspeople in Croatia
Expatriate soccer players in Canada
American expatriate sportspeople in Canada